Cottiusculus  is a genus of marine ray-finned fishes belonging to the family Cottidae, the typical sculpins. The fishes in this genus are found in the northwestern Pacific Ocean.

Species
There are currently three recognized species in this genus:
 Cottiusculus gonez Jordan & Starks, 1904
 Cottiusculus nihonkaiensis Kai & Nakabo, 2009
 Cottiusculus schmidti Jordan & Starks, 1904

References

Cottinae
Taxa named by David Starr Jordan
Taxa named by Edwin Chapin Starks
Fish described in 1904